Mehrdad Mehryar is an Iranian professional handball player who plays for SSV Bozen Loacker and Iran men's national handball team.

Mehryar is one of the best players and talented left-handed in his generation.
He has started handball before elementary school. It's about thirty years that he has been in this profession, Mehryar has won several championships, honors and individual titles in league of different countries like Iran, Emirates, Qatar, Oman and Italy, a Serie A (men's handball) championship, an Italian super cup championship, a Coppa Italia championship, the serie A most valuable player.

References 

Year of birth missing (living people)
Living people
Iranian male handball players